Tavaana: E-Learning Institute for Iranian Civil Society provides free online training and Persian and English learning resources to Iranians. Tavaana -  meaning "empowered" and "capable" in Persian – was launched in 2010 with a mission “to support active citizenship and civic leadership in Iran through education and civil society capacity building.” 

The initiative uses blended civic education via live e-classrooms, correspondence learning, satellite television, and social networks to provide Iranians with education on democracy, women's rights, religious freedom, civic activism, and more. In addition to online courses, the site offers case studies, interviews, translations, public service announcements, e-books, and an online resource library. TavaanaTech is a Persian-language service providing guidance on circumventing internet censorship and keeping safe online.

History 
According to Tavaana's website, the project seeks a “free and open Iranian society, one in which each and every Iranian enjoys equality, justice and the full spectrum of civil and political liberties.” Tavaana was founded by Akbar Atri, a former student leader and drafter of a referendum for a democratic Iranian constitution, and Mariam Memarsadeghi, who previously headed Freedom House’s Middle East and North Africa programs. 
	
Tavaana was originally incubated as a project of the Center for Liberty in the Middle East through a seed grant from the U.S. Department of State’s Bureau for Democracy, Human Rights and Labor. In 2011 Tavaana became a project of the E-Collaborative for Civic Education (ECCE), a US-based non-profit organization with a mission to leverage technology to promote civic learning and democratic political life internationally.

Activities 
Tavaana’s instructor-led courses take place on a live interactive platform. Live sessions are supplemented by a discussion forum, podcasts, video lectures, readings, and assignments. Tavaana has trained over 2,800 students in live classrooms and received over 20,000 course applications.

Tavaana produces video interviews with Iranian and international activists, such as Vaclav Havel and Azar Nafisi, and case studies on civic movements for human rights, democracy, and Internet freedom worldwide, including the Velvet Revolution and the Civil Rights Movement. There are also translations of democracy classics and texts written by Iranian civic leaders, pedagogic resources, public service announcements, and a virtual library of Persian and English resources.

Tavaana partners with Iranian cartoonist Mana Neyestani to produce weekly cartoons as well as an exclusive series of cartoons titled “Moderation Place,” a satirical look at policies and political developments under Iranian President Rouhani.

Tavaana's social network includes pages on Facebook, Twitter, Google+, Instagram, SoundCloud, Telegram, and YouTube. Tavaana's Facebook page has over 500,000 followers as of July 2016. Tavaana video programming is also broadcast several times weekly over satellite television stations including Andisheh TV.

Courses 
Tavaana's offerings include classes on democracy and human rights advocacy, citizen journalism, philosophy of law, NGO management, women's rights, labor organizing, minority rights and the politics of inclusion, LGBT rights, the environment, and religious freedom. The project offers several digital safety and technology activism courses.

TavaanaTech 
In 2012, Tavaana launched TavaanaTech, an open platform for Iranian Internet users to ask questions about digital technology and online safety and receive updates on circumventing censorship, such as through Psiphon. TavaanaTech includes sections on digital safety, computer and Internet news, the Internet in Iran, social networking, and mobile phones and tablets.

Tolerance Project 
In 2015, Tavaana launched the Tolerance Project, an Arabic-Persian-English civic education effort to promote conscience, pluralism, religious freedom, and celebration of difference. The project is aimed at sparking civic dialogue and providing educational resources for audiences in the Middle East to prevent persecution and genocide.

Partnerships 
Tavaana has curricular partnerships with several civic education and human rights organizations. Through a joint initiative with Freedom House and the Albert Shanker Institute, Tavaana offers the Democracy Web e-course, translated to Persian. Tavaana partners with The Center for Civic Education/CIVITAS for the translation, adaptation and instruction of the Foundations of Democracy e-course and translation of other curricula. Tavaana has also collaborated closely with the New Tactics in Human Rights Project, Heartland Alliance for Human Rights and Human Needs, George Washington University's Graduate School of Political Management, the Iranian Queer Organization, and the United States Holocaust Memorial Museum.

Faculty 
Prominent Tavaana faculty members include:

 Kamiar Alaei
 Ladan Boroumand
 Golriz Ghahraman
 Nazila Ghanea
 Ramin Jahanbegloo
 Mehrangiz Kar  
 Mehdi Khalaji
 Ivan Marovic
 Majid Mohammadi
 Ebrahim Nabavi
 Arash Naraghi
 Mohammad Reza Nikfar
 Mansour Osanlou
 Saeed Paivandi 
 Nancy Pearson
 Nima Rashedan 
 Mohsen Sazegara
 Kathleen Schafer
 Hassan Shariatmadari

Funding 
The Tavaana project has been transparent about its funding sources since its launch. The project was founded with a seed grant from the U.S. Department of State's Bureau for Democracy, Human Rights, and Labor. Tavaana has since secured additional funds from the Department of State as well as funding from the National Endowment for Democracy, the Netherlands Ministry of Foreign Affairs, the U.S. Agency for International Development, Internews, and Google, in addition to individual donors. Google provides Tavaana with free AdWords and protection against Denial-of-service attacks through Project Shield.

References

External links 
 Tavaana (English)

American educational websites
Iranian diaspora organizations